Clay Johnston (born August 8, 1996) is an American football linebacker for the Cincinnati Bengals of the National Football League (NFL). He played college football at Baylor.

College career
Johnston missed several games in 2017. He was a second-team all-Big 12 Conference selection in 2018 after recording a team-high 99 tackles. As a senior, he made 58 tackles, eight for loss, 2.5 sacks, one interception, and five pass breakups. Johnston only played six games due to a knee injury that ended his season early. He was again named to the second-team All-Big 12.

Professional career

Los Angeles Rams
Johnston was selected by the Los Angeles Rams in the seventh round (234th overall) of the 2020 NFL Draft. He was waived on September 5, 2020.

Carolina Panthers
On September 8, 2020, Johnston was signed to the Carolina Panthers' practice squad. He was elevated to the active roster on December 26 and January 2, 2021, for the team's weeks 16 and 17 games against the Washington Football Team and New Orleans Saints, and reverted to the practice squad after each game. He signed a reserve/future contract with the Panthers on January 4, 2021.

Johnston made the Panthers 53-man roster in 2021 as a backup linebacker and special teamer. He played in six games before being waived on November 8, 2021.

Cincinnati Bengals
On November 9, 2021, Johnston was claimed off waivers by the Cincinnati Bengals. He played in Super Bowl LVI, recording one tackle.

Personal life
His father, Kent Johnston, was a strength coach for over two decades in the NFL, and was also Brett Favre’s best man for his wedding. He has three brothers Kody, Kole, and Cade. Kody played collegiate football at Texas A&M University and Kole participated in collegiate football at Tarleton State University.

References

External links
Baylor Bears bio

1996 births
American football linebackers
Baylor Bears football players
Carolina Panthers players
Cincinnati Bengals players
Living people
Los Angeles Rams players
Players of American football from Texas
Players of American football from Wisconsin
Sportspeople from Abilene, Texas
Sportspeople from Green Bay, Wisconsin